Bateau is a steakhouse located in Seattle, founded by chef Renee Erickson.

History
The restaurant opened in 2015. Bateau makes an effort to reduce the environmental impact of the beef it serves. One such practice to minimize the restaurant's impact, whole-animal butchery, means the restaurant serves cuts that other steakhouses do not typically serve.

The restaurant closed temporarily during the 2021 Western North America heat wave.

Reception
The restaurant has received positive reviews from critics. In a review for The Seattle Times, critic Providence Cicero gave the restaurant her first four-star review. Cicero praised the "entire dining experience" as "smooth sailing". Cicero specifically praised the quality of the service and the knowledge of the waitstaff. The review also referred to the meat as "exceptional" and highlighted the "sides and starters" as "[playing] more than just a supporting role".

The restaurant was featured on Eaters list of the best new restaurants of 2016. Aimee Rizzo included Spinasse in The Infatuation's 2023 overview of Seattle's 25 best restaurants.

References

External links

 

2015 establishments in Washington (state)
Restaurants established in 2015
Restaurants in Seattle
Steakhouses in Washington (state)